is a Japanese actress, voice actress and singer. She has been the voice of Rukia Kuchiki in Bleach, Meyrin Hawke in Mobile Suit Gundam Seed Destiny, Chun-Li in Street Fighter, Kanade Minamino/Cure Rhythm in Suite PreCure, Lotte Yanson in Little Witch Academia and Riza Hawkeye in Fullmetal Alchemist: Brotherhood.

Filmography

Anime series

Unknown

OVA/ONA

Film/Movie

Video Games

Tokusatsu

Dubbed

Discography

Singles

Album

References

External links
 
 

1974 births
Living people
Anime singers
Japanese video game actresses
Japanese voice actresses
Singers from Tokyo
Tokyo Actor's Consumer's Cooperative Society voice actors
Voice actresses from Tokyo Metropolis
21st-century Japanese women singers
21st-century Japanese singers